Bill Shannon (born 1970) is an American artist who resides in Pittsburgh, Pennsylvania. Shannon holds a BFA from the School of the Art Institute of Chicago. Born with a degenerative hip condition, he developed a way to express himself through dance and skateboarding on crutches.

Performances
Performances and video work include:
 Kaaitheater, Brussels
 Performance Space 122, NYC
 The Kitchen, NYC
 Sydney Opera House Studio Theater, Australia
 Walker Art Center, Minneapolis
 Portland Institute for Contemporary Art, OR
 Central Park SummerStage, NYC
 Dance City, Newcastle, England
 Contact Theater, Manchester, England
 Museum of Contemporary Art, Chicago
 Arizona State University, Tempe
 The Exit Festival, Cretiel, France
 Amman International Festival of Independent Theater, Amman, Jordan
 Holland Festival, Amsterdam
 Temple Bar, Dublin, Ireland
 URB Festival, Helsinki
 Melbourne Fringe Festival
 Teatro de la Ciudad in Monterrey, Mexico
 "Work It Out" music video by RJD2 (2007)
 'Life flows better' Visa advert, (2009)

In 2002, he completed a project with Cirque du Soleil choreographing parts of their production Varekai.

His visual and multimedia art have been exhibited in contemporary museums, galleries and fairs include:
 ArtDC in Washington, DC (2007)
 Kiasma
 Helsinki Museum of Contemporary Art in Finland (2005)
 Tate in Liverpool, England (2003)
 Headlands Center for the Arts in San Francisco (2005).

Awards
 Dance Magazine's "25 to Watch" in 2001
 John Simon Guggenheim Fellowship in 2003
 Foundation for Contemporary Arts Grants to Artists award (2000)
 Colbert Award for Excellence: The Downtown Arts Projects Emerging Arts Award
 Pennsylvania Council of the Arts Interdisciplinary Arts Fellowship
 Wynn Newhouse Award in 2010

Grants
 National Endowment for the Arts
 the National Dance Project of the New England Foundation for the Arts
 Jerome Foundation
 New York Foundation for the Arts
 New York State Council for the Arts
 James E. Robison Foundation
 Bossak-Heilbron Charitable Foundation
 The Harkness Foundation for Dance
 Arts International: The Fund for U.S. Artists at International Festivals.

Competitions
 2000: Mantis Battle (Solo Category) in NYC; placed second in ProAms Florida (Abstract Category)
 2002: Most Creative Street Dancer by the LA Urban Dance Festival.

References

External links
 Official site
 Turning the Tables: Artist and performer Bill Shannon keeps audiences off balance (Pittsburgh City Paper)
 Boundaries Blurred: Hip Hop Dance and Disability
 Bill Shannon 'Crutchmaster' in his acclaimed work, Spatial Theory
 Visa advert

American male dancers
School of the Art Institute of Chicago alumni
1970 births
Living people
Artists from Brooklyn